Kim Woo-jae (김우재; born 26 September 1991) is a South Korean weightlifter competing in the 77 kg category until 2018 and 81 kg starting in 2018 after the International Weightlifting Federation reorganized the categories. He won the bronze medal in the men's 81kg event at the 2022 World Weightlifting Championships held in Bogotá, Colombia.

Career
He won the silver medal at the 2018 Asian Games in the 77 kg division.

Major results

References

South Korean male weightlifters
1991 births
Living people
Asian Games medalists in weightlifting
Weightlifters at the 2018 Asian Games
Asian Games silver medalists for South Korea
Medalists at the 2018 Asian Games
World Weightlifting Championships medalists
21st-century South Korean people